Saint Quirinus (or Cyrinus) may refer to:

Quirinus of Rome:
 Quirinus of Neuss (feast day: April 30)
 Quirinus of Tegernsee (feast day: March 25)
 Quirinus of Sescia (feast day: June 4)
 Quirinus of Tivoli (feast day: June 4)
 Quirinus (Africa) (feast day: June 3), accompanied by Saint Abidianus and Saint Papocinicus
 Quirinus of the grouping Nicasius, Quirinus, Scubiculus, and Pientia (feast day: October 11), venerated as martyrs and saints

See also 

 Saint-Quirin, French commune
 San Quirino, Italian commune